Care Not Killing is an alliance of several organisations who are opposed to the legalisation of euthanasia or physician-assisted suicide in the United Kingdom. Their goals include promoting more and better palliative care, ensuring that existing laws against euthanasia and assisted suicide are not weakened or repealed during the lifetime of the current Parliament, influencing the balance of public opinion against any weakening of the law. They are opposed in their efforts by pro-assisted dying groups such as Dignity in Dying and Humanists UK. Since its inception, the role of Campaign Director had been filled by the CEO of the Christian Medical Fellowship, Peter Saunders, who worked for the organisation pro bono. He left the role in December 2018.

Alliance members

The members of the alliance include:
 Christian Medical Fellowship
 The Church of England
 The Church of Scotland
 RADAR (The Disability Network)

2006 petition
Care Not Killing launched a petition in opposition to a Bill put forward by Lord Joffe. This was signed by 102,363 people in four weeks, and presented to 10 Downing Street on May 12, 2006.

See also 
 Euthanasia in the United Kingdom
 Not Dead Yet, a similar group in the United States

References

Anti-euthanasia alliance launched - BBC News

External links 
Care Not Killing alliance

Euthanasia in the United Kingdom
Medical and health organisations based in the United Kingdom
Palliative care in the United Kingdom